"Let the Wind Blow" is a song written by Brian Wilson and Mike Love for American rock band the Beach Boys. It was released in 1967 as the ninth track on their thirteenth studio album Wild Honey. The song is a ballad with lyrics that metaphorically relate nature to the essence of love. It is the first composition recorded by the group that is in  time from beginning to end.

Critical reception
Music theorist Daniel Harrison called it "the most arresting and compositionally assured song on the album, and it echoes the formal and harmonic technique of 'God Only Knows'." Stylus Magazine wrote: "'Let the Wind Blow' is a moody ballad that swirls and throbs with a subtle psychedelia more hinted at than indulged in; proof of a growing sophistication that improves upon the Smiley Smile formula." In 1968, Gene Sculatti said the song was further evidence of Wilson's "weird ear for melody". PopMatters wrote that, in contrast to the Wild Honey single "Darlin'", "'Let the Wind Blow' ... is forlorn and urgent, with a gripping chorus and somber production. It’s fantastic."

Variations
An alternate stereo mix of "Let the Wind Blow" was included on the rarities compilation Hawthorne CA (2001). A live performance of the song appears on the album The Beach Boys in Concert (1973).

Personnel
Sourced from Craig Slowinski.

The Beach Boys
Mike Love – vocals
Brian Wilson – vocals, piano, organ
Carl Wilson – vocals, guitar, bass
Dennis Wilson – drums

Cover versions

1995 – Brian Wilson, I Just Wasn't Made for These Times

References

1967 songs
The Beach Boys songs
Brian Wilson songs
Pop ballads
Songs written by Brian Wilson
Songs written by Mike Love
Song recordings produced by Brian Wilson